Natural Computing is a scientific journal covering natural computing research. It has been published quarterly by Springer Verlag (Springer Netherlands) in print and online since 2002.

"Natural Computing refers to computational processes observed in nature, and human-designed computing inspired by nature ... molecular computing and quantum computing ... use of algorithms to consider evolution as a computational process, and neural networks in light of computational trends in brain research." 

It includes 19 open access articles as of 19 June 2016 and has an impact factor of 1.310.

References

Computer science journals
English-language journals
Springer Science+Business Media academic journals
Quarterly journals
Publications established in 2002